Jacob Eriksson (born 1 October 1999) is a Swedish cyclist, who currently rides for UCI ProTeam . His brother Lucas is also a professional cyclist on the same team.

Major results

2016
 1st Mountains classification, Tour du Pays de Vaud
 3rd Road race, National Junior Road Championships
2017
 1st  Road race, National Junior Road Championships
 1st Mountains classification, Grand Prix Rüebliland
 6th Overall Peace Race Juniors
2018
 2nd Road race, National Under-23 Road Championships
2019
 2nd Road race, National Under-23 Road Championships
2020
 1st  Road race, National Under-23 Road Championships
 2nd Road race, National Road Championships
2021
 4th Lillehammer GP
 5th Gylne Gutuer
 7th Skive–Løbet
 9th Overall Arctic Race of Norway
2022
 3rd Road race, National Road Championships
 4th Volta Limburg Classic
 7th Overall Circuit des Ardennes

References

External links

Swedish male cyclists
1999 births
Living people
People from Borås Municipality
Sportspeople from Västra Götaland County